Süleymanlı can refer to:

 Süleymanlı
 Süleymanlı, Azerbaijan
 Süleymanlı, Buldan
 Süleymanlı, Çankırı
 Süleymanlı, Manyas
 Süleymanlı, Oltu